Backbone is the second album by jazz saxophonist Boney James, released in 1994.

Personnel 
Musicians
 Boney James – all other instruments except where noted, tenor saxophone (1-6, 8, 9), soprano saxophone (2, 3, 7), Yamaha WX7 (2, 9), keyboards (4, 7), clavinet (6)
 David Torkanowsky – acoustic piano (1, 3), keyboards (4, 7)
 Jeff Carruthers – keyboards (2, 6)
 Kiki Ebsen – keyboards (5)
 Darrell Smith – keyboards (8)
 Paul Jackson Jr. – guitars (1, 2, 3, 8)
 Allen Hinds – guitars (6)
 Doc Powell – guitars (7, 9)
 Peter White – acoustic guitar (8)
 Freddie Washington – bass (2, 8)
 Roberto Vally – bass (4)
 Dwayne "Smitty" Smith – bass (7)
 Lenny Castro – percussion (1-4, 8, 9)
 Sam RIney – alto flute (4)
 Bridgette Bryant – vocals (7)
 Alex Brown – vocals (8)
 Gene Van Buren – vocals (8)

Arrangements
 Boney James (1, 3, 4, 7, 8)
 Paul Brown (1, 3, 4, 7, 8)
 Carl Burnett (1)
 Jeff Carruthers (2, 3, 6, 9)
 Darrell Smith (8)

Production 
 Paul Brown – producer, recording, mixing 
 Jeff Carruthers – co-producer (2, 3)
 Stephen Marcussen – mastering at Precision Mastering (Hollywood, California)
 Christine Caro – art direction, design 
 Andrea Marouk – photography 
 Tracy Lamonica – portrait artwork 
 Howard Lowell – management

References 

1993 albums
Boney James albums
Warner Records albums